The Christ Church is an Anglican church located in , Victoria, Australia. Designed by Edmund Blacket, the church is the oldest Anglican church in Victoria, in continuous use on its original site.

On 9 October 1974 the church was listed on the Victorian Heritage Register with the following statement of significance:

History
The Geelong parish pre-dates the Diocese of Melbourne and was founded on 7 October 1843, when the Bishop of Australia, William Grant Broughton, laid the foundation stone at the north-east corner of the present nave. The church was opened and dedicated on 27 June 1847, and the enlarged church was consecrated on 25 October 1859. The church is the only one in Victoria designed by the colonial architect, Edmund Blacket. It was enlarged in 1855 by the addition of the transepts and sanctuary.

Christ Church has been given an A Classification by the National Trust and is listed on the (now defunct) Register of the National Estate.

See also

 List of Anglican churches in Melbourne

References

External links
Christ Church Geelong website

Anglican churches in Victoria (Australia)
Buildings and structures in Geelong
Edmund Blacket church buildings
Heritage-listed buildings in Greater Geelong
Churches completed in 1847
1847 establishments in Australia